Kipps is a 1921 British silent drama film directed by Harold M. Shaw and starring George K. Arthur, Edna Flugrath and Christine Rayner. It is an adaptation of the 1905 novel Kipps by H.G. Wells. It was made by Stoll Pictures, the largest film company in the British Isles at the time. The novel was subsequently remade into the 1941 sound film Kipps directed by Carol Reed.

Synopsis
After losing his job in a Folkestone drapery, young Arthur Kipps inherits a considerable sum of money and has his head turned towards the well-bred Helen Walsingham and away from his childhood sweetheart Ann.

Cast
 George K. Arthur as Arthur Kipps 
 Edna Flugrath as Ann Pornick 
 Christine Rayner as Helen Walsingham 
 Teddy Arundell as Harry Chitterlow 
 Norman Thorpe as Chester Coote 
 Arthur Helmore as Shelford 
 John Marlborough East as Old Kipps 
 Annie Esmond as Old Kipps' Wife

References

Bibliography
 Low, Rachael. The History of British Film, Volume 4 1918-1929. Routledge, 1997.

External links

1921 films
1921 drama films
1920s English-language films
Films directed by Harold M. Shaw
Stoll Pictures films
Films based on British novels
British drama films
British silent feature films
British black-and-white films
1920s British films
Silent drama films
Films set in Kent